KRMO (990 AM) is a radio station broadcasting a country music format. It is licensed to Cassville, Missouri, United States, and serves the Joplin area. The station is owned by Eagle Broadcasting, Inc. and features programming from ABC Radio .

990 AM is a Canadian clear-channel frequency.

References

External links

RMO